A Master of Business and Law is a two-year master's degree that aims to familiarize the students with the business skills and knowledge of commercial elements of law that might be considered useful for a career in business and/or as an entrepreneur.

Master's degrees
Law degrees
Business qualifications